The elements composing the Layer of Rods and Cones (Jacob's membrane) in the retina of the eye are of two kinds, rod cells and cone cells, the former being much more numerous than the latter except in the macula lutea.

Jacob's membrane is named after Irish ophthalmologist Arthur Jacob, who was the first to describe this nervous layer of the retina.

References

External links
 

Human eye anatomy